This was a new event on the 2013 ITF Women's Circuit.

Lyudmyla Kichenok won the tournament, defeating Valentyna Ivakhnenko in the final, 6–2, 2–6, 6–2.

Seeds

Main draw

Finals

Top half

Bottom half

References 
 Main draw

Kazan Summer Cup - Women's Singles
Kazan Summer Cup
Kazan Summer Cup - Women's Singles